Eric Green may refer to:

Sportspeople
 Eric Green (cornerback) (born 1982), American football player
 Eric Green (field hockey) (1878–1972), 1908 Summer Olympics gold medalist
 Eric Green (golfer) (1908–1980), English golfer
 Eric Green (tight end) (born 1967), retired American football tight end
 Erick Green (born 1991), American basketball player

Others
 Eric Green (admiral) (died 2014), South African Navy admiral
 Eric D. Green (born 1959), director of the National Human Genome Research Institute
 Eric Green, drummer for the Riverboat Gamblers
 Eric Green (Jericho character), a character in the TV series Jericho